Andrew Carlson (born August 18, 1977) is an American former professional tennis player.

A left-handed player from Maryland, Carlson competed in collegiate tennis for Ohio State University.

Carlson made an ATP Tour main draw appearance at the 2003 Legg Mason Tennis Classic, where he lost in the first round to Mike Bryan. He was a quarter-finalist in the doubles draw, partnering Chris Groer.

In 2021 he was appointed as the head coach of men's and women's tennis at Kenyon College.

ITF Futures titles

Doubles: (1)

References

External links
 
 

1977 births
Living people
American male tennis players
Ohio State Buckeyes men's tennis players
Tennis people from Maryland
20th-century American people
21st-century American people